Apamea centralis is a moth of the family Noctuidae first described by Smith in 1891. It is native to North America, where its range extends from California to Alberta.

External links

Apamea (moth)
Moths of North America
Moths described in 1891